The 1993–94 Esiliiga is the third season of the Esiliiga, second-highest Estonian league for association football clubs, since its establishment in 1992.

Standings

See also
 1993–94 Meistriliiga
 1993 in Estonian football
 1994 in Estonian football

Esiliiga seasons
2
2
Estonia